Albert Evans (17 October 1901 – 1969) was a professional footballer who played for Woking, Tottenham Hotspur and Grantham Town.

Football career 
Evans began his career at Woking. The forward joined Tottenham Hotspur in 1927 where he played in five matches between 1927–28. After leaving the Lilywhites he went on to play for Grantham Town.

References 

1901 births
1969 deaths
Footballers from Camberwell
English footballers
English Football League players
Woking F.C. players
Tottenham Hotspur F.C. players
Grantham Town F.C. players
Association football forwards